Southwest Florida International Airport  is a major county-owned airport in the South Fort Myers area of unincorporated Lee County, Florida, United States. The airport serves the Southwest Florida region, including the Cape Coral-Fort Myers, Naples-Marco Island, and Punta Gorda metropolitan areas, and is a U.S. Customs and Border Protection port of entry. It currently is the second-busiest single-runway airport in the United States, after San Diego International Airport. In 2022, the airport served 10,343,802 passengers, the most in its history.

The airport sits on 13,555 acres (5,486 ha, 21.2 sq.mi.) of land just southeast of Fort Myers, making it the third-largest airport in the United States in terms of land size (after Denver and Dallas/Fort Worth). 6,000 acres of the land has been conserved as swamp lands and set aside for environmental mitigation.

History
Prior to the opening of the airport, the region was served by Page Field in Fort Myers. By the 1970s, however, it had become clear that Page Field would be too small to handle increasing future demand for commercial flights into the region. Expanding Page Field was determined to be impractical because its airfield was constrained by U.S. 41 to the west and expanding the airfield to the east would require bridging the Ten Mile Canal and relocating a railroad track.

A number of sites were considered for a new regional airport, including southern Charlotte County, Estero, and northeast Cape Coral near Burnt Store Marina. The government of Lee County ultimately selected a site near the end of Daniels Road which was a dirt road at the time. An advantage to this location was its proximity to Interstate 75, which was under construction and would have an interchange with Daniels Road, providing easy access (Interstate 75 was opened to traffic through Fort Myers in 1979).

Construction of the airport began in 1980; it opened on schedule on May 14, 1983, with a single 8400-ft runway. At the time of its opening, the airport was named Southwest Florida Regional Airport (the airport code RSW is short for "Regional South-West"). Delta Air Lines operated the first flight. The airport's original terminal was located on the north side of the runway at the end of Chamberlin Parkway and it initially included 14 gates on two concourses.

The airport was renamed Southwest Florida International Airport in 1993, though it had hosted international flights since 1984 and U.S. Customs since 1987. The name change coincided with the completion of a 55,000 square foot Federal Inspection facility annexed to the original terminal's Concourse A. The runway was also lengthened to 12,000 ft (3,658 m) at the same time to better accommodate international service (making it the fourth-longest runway in Florida).

In 1988 the airport exceeded its annual capacity of 3 million passengers; by 2004, the airport was serving nearly 7 million passengers annually. In 1998, the original terminal was expanded with a new wing added to Concourse B which included three additional gates, bringing the total to 17.

LTU International delivered Fort Myers its first nonstop flights to Europe in April 1994, introducing service to Germany. The inaugural flight arrived from Munich via Düsseldorf, while the return to Munich stopped in both Miami and Düsseldorf. The new route came in response to rising tourism from Germany, which Lee County had spent the past several years cultivating. The county considered Germany a natural market to target, given the sizable German-American community that lived in Southwest Florida and maintained ties with its country of origin. Condor joined LTU in 2000 with a flight to Frankfurt.

With the terminal operating at more than double its intended capacity, construction of a new Midfield Terminal Complex began in February 2002. The $438 million terminal opened on September 9, 2005. The terminal, designed by Spillis Candela/DMJM Aviation, has three concourses and 28 gates and can eventually expand to five concourses with 65 gates.

Demolition of the former terminal north of the airfield was completed in spring 2006. However, the original terminal's parking lot and other related infrastructure still stand at the end of Chamberlin Parkway. The former terminal's ramp, now known as North Ramp, is now primarily used as a base for Western Global Airlines, an Estero-based cargo airline.

After deciding to prioritize its service to Orlando, Condor withdrew from Fort Myers in 2007. Two years later, Air Berlin replaced LTU at the airport following the merger of the two airlines.

In early 2015, Terminal Access Road, the airport's main entrance road, was extended past Treeline Avenue to connect directly to Interstate 75, allowing airport-related traffic to avoid local streets. The airport can now be accessed directly from the freeway at Exit 128. Terminal Access Road was then expanded to six lanes in late 2016.

Air Berlin continued to serve Fort Myers until it ceased operations in 2017. Transatlantic flights resumed within a year when Eurowings opened routes to Düsseldorf, Munich, and Cologne; however, the COVID-19 pandemic caused the company to suspend flights. In mid-2021, the Lufthansa Group revealed that a new airline brand, Eurowings Discover, would link Fort Myers to Frankfurt beginning in March 2022.

Current and future projects
A new $16 million Airport Rescue and Fire Fighting facility (Lee County Station 92) opened in July 2013. A  parallel runway is in planning. The project includes a relocated air traffic control tower, apron expansion, crossfield taxiway system, mitigation activities and FPL electrical line relocation. The new air traffic control tower and parallel runway were expected to be completed by 2019, but this was pushed back to late 2020. The apron expansion and crossfield taxiway system were completed in late 2013. The entire project is estimated to cost $454 million.

In early 2018, the Lee County Port Authority (LCPA) announced plans to ease seasonal security wait times by expanding and relocating the current security checkpoints for each concourse. By relocating each checkpoint, there will be more restaurants, shops, and post-security spaces. According to the announcement by the LCPA, this expansion could cost between $150 million – $180 million.

Plans are in place for Skyplex – a commercial and industrial park in the location of the old terminal. Other airport-related businesses, such as a hotel, are in the planning stages. A retail gasoline outlet near the airport's entrance opened in June 2014.

Facilities

Airfield
The airport covers 13,555 acres (54.9 km2), 10 mi (16 km) southeast of Fort Myers.

Runways
 Runway 06/24: 12,000 x 150 ft (3,658 x 46 m), asphalt

Activity
In 2020 the airport had 74,901 aircraft operations, averaging 205 per day.

Terminal
 
 Design capacity is 10 million passengers per year, with 28 gates on three concourses (current B,C and D). The terminal buildings can be expanded incrementally to 65 gates on five concourses (A-E).

Parking
 11,250 spaces for hourly/daily parking located around the main terminal building and the entrance to the facility. 
 There is a three-story parking structure adjacent from the main terminal, used to house short-term parking. 
 30-space "cell-phone lot" for customers picking up arriving passengers

Awards
J.D. Power & Associates Airport Satisfaction Study – Ranked 2nd among North American airports with under 10 million annual passengers
Florida Department of Transportation 2008 Commercial Airport of the Year
Airports Council International-North America Excellence in Marketing and Communications 2008: 1st Place Special Events for Aviation Day
Airports Council International-North America 2008: 1st Place for Concession Convenience and 2nd Place for Food Concessions
Airports Council International-North America 2009: 2nd Place Newsletter – Internal or E-mail and 2nd Place Special Events – Berlin Airlift
Federal Aviation Administration 2009 Disadvantaged Business Enterprise Advocate and Partner Award
Florida Airports Council 2008 Environmental Excellence Award for Mitigation Park
Airport Revenue News 2008 Best Concessions Award for top Concessions Program Design

Terminals
The airport has one terminal with three concourses: Concourse B serves Air Canada, Alaska Airlines, Avelo Airlines, Eurowings, Frontier, Southwest, and Sun Country; Concourse C serves Delta, United, and WestJet; and Concourse D serves American, 
Breeze, JetBlue, and Spirit. Customs and Immigration services for international flights are located on the lower level of Concourse B. The concourses are each completely separate and are not connected Airside. Concourses A and E designations have been reserved for the planned future expansion of the terminal.

Airlines and destinations

Passenger

Cargo

Statistics
Since beginning commercial airline service on May 14, 1983 through the end of 2022, nearly 232.2 million passengers (enplaned and deplaned) have transited through RSW. There has been nearly 2.94 million aircraft operations at the airport since its opening.

Top destinations

Airline Market Share

Annual traffic

Accidents and incidents
 November 28, 2007 – A single-engine fixed wing aircraft crashed about 9:20 a.m. one mile (1.6 km) west of Runway 6. The crash killed the pilot. This is the first reported crash on airport property.
 April 12, 2009 – A Beech King Air 200 (N559DW) was carrying four passengers when the pilot went unconscious and later died. Doug White, a passenger, was guided into the airport by air traffic controller Brian Norton, assisted by controller Dan Favio. It was later reported that White was a single engine private pilot with about 130 hours of experience in single engine aircraft. All passengers aboard survived and the plane was not damaged.
 October 18, 2022 - A United Airlines Boeing 737-800 arriving from Newark, NJ safely landed but blew out two tires, stranding it on the airport's lone runway and forcing other incoming flights to be diverted while outbound flights were delayed. The runway was closed for nearly nine hours as specialized equipment to fix the plane had to be driven over from Orlando.

Ground transport
LeeTran bus No. 50 serves the airport.

Recent infrastructure and road projects linked the airport's main terminal road to the southbound and northbound lanes of Interstate 75.

See also
 Southwest Florida
 Florida Suncoast

References

External links

 Southwest Florida International Airport (official site)
  brochure from CFASPP
 
 

PrivateSky Aviation (Official Site) Serves as FBO and Gulfstream MRO Service Center

Airports in Florida
Airports established in 1983
Transportation buildings and structures in Lee County, Florida
Transportation in Fort Myers, Florida
1983 establishments in Florida